|}

The Tattersalls Ireland Novice Hurdle is a Grade 1 National Hunt hurdle race in Ireland which is open to horses aged five years or older. It is run at Leopardstown over a distance of about 2 miles (3,219 metres), and during its running there are nine hurdles to be jumped. The race is for novice hurdlers, and it is scheduled to take place each year in February.

The race was established in 1987, and during its early years it was sponsored by Paddy Power and Le Coq Hardi. Deloitte, supported the event from 1992 to 2017. The race continued as the Deloitte and Touche Novice Hurdle until 2003, and was known as the Deloitte Novice Hurdle from 2004 to 2018. From 2019 to 2021 the race was sponsored by the Chanelle Pharmaceutical Group and since 2022 it has been sponsored by Tattersalls. Prior to 2018 it was run over a distance of 2 miles and 2 furlongs.

Winners of the Tattersalls Ireland Novice Hurdle usually go on to compete in either the Supreme Novices' Hurdle or the Ballymore Novices' Hurdle. Those to have also achieved victory in one of those races are Danoli, Istabraq, Like-A-Butterfly, Brave Inca, Champagne Fever, Vautour, Samcro and Appreciate It.

Records
Leading jockey (6 wins):
 Paul Carberry – Bolino Star (1996), Native Estates (1998), 	Solerina (2003), Mr Nosie (2006), Aran Concerto (2007), Pandorama (2009)

Leading trainer (11 wins):
 Willie Mullins - Alexander Banquet (1999), Champagne Fever (2013), Vautour (2014), Nichols Canyon (2015), Bleu Et Rouge (2016), 	Bacardys (2017), Klassical Dream (2019), Asterion Forlonge (2020), Appreciate It (2021), Sir Gerhard (2022), Il Etait Temps (2023)

Winners

See also
 Horse racing in Ireland
 List of Irish National Hunt races

References
 Racing Post:

 pedigreequery.com – Deloitte Novice Hurdle – Leopardstown.

National Hunt races in Ireland
National Hunt hurdle races
Leopardstown Racecourse
Recurring sporting events established in 1987
1987 establishments in Ireland